Acrolophus corrientis is a moth of the family Acrolophidae. It is found in Argentina.

References

corrientis
Moths described in 1887